The Apple A10X Fusion is a 64-bit ARM-based system on a chip (SoC) designed by Apple Inc. and manufactured by TSMC.  It first appeared in the 10.5" iPad Pro and the second-generation 12.9" iPad Pro, which were both announced on June 5, 2017.  The A10X is a variant of the A10 and Apple claims that it has 30 percent faster CPU performance and 40 percent faster GPU performance than its predecessor, the A9X.

Design 
The A10X features an Apple-designed 64-bit 2.38 GHz ARMv8-A six-core CPU, with three high-performance Hurricane cores and three energy-efficient Zephyr cores.  The A10X also integrates a twelve-core graphics processing unit (GPU) which appears to be the same Apple customized Imagination PowerVR cores used in the  A10. Embedded in the A10X is the M10 motion coprocessor.  

The A10X is the first TSMC 10nm chip to be used by a consumer device.

The A10X is paired with 4 GB of LPDDR4 memory in the second-generation 12.9" iPad Pro and the 10.5" iPad Pro, and 3 GB in the 4K Apple TV.

The A10X has video codec encoding support for H.264. It has decoding support for HEVC, H.264, MPEG‑4, and Motion JPEG.

Products that include the Apple A10X 
 iPad Pro 10.5-inch (2017)
 iPad Pro 12.9-inch (2nd generation, 2017)
 Apple TV 4K (2017)

See also 
 Apple silicon, the series of ARM-based system-on-a-chip (SoC) processors designed by Apple.
 Apple A10 Fusion

References 

Computer-related introductions in 2017
Apple silicon